Stuart Michael Magee (born 13 October 1943, in Northern Ireland) is a former Australian rules footballer who played with South Melbourne and Footscray in the Victorian Football League (VFL).

Magee, who played as a centreman and rover, made his debut for South Melbourne in 1962. By 1966 he was representing Victoria at interstate football but soon after he was let go by South Melbourne. He was signed up by Footscray and became captain of the club during the 1970 season after the retirement of Ted Whitten. In 1976 he moved to the West Australian National Football League (WANFL) and joined the Swan Districts as captain-coach.

References

External links 
 
 
Stuart Magee's playing statistics from WAFL Footy Facts

1943 births
Living people
VFL/AFL players born outside Australia
Sydney Swans players
Western Bulldogs players
East Fremantle Football Club players
Swan Districts Football Club players
Swan Districts Football Club coaches
Irish players of Australian rules football
Irish emigrants to Australia
Australian rules footballers from Victoria (Australia)